Willow Valley may refer to:

 Willow Valley, Arizona, United States
 Willow Valley, California, United States
 Willow Valley, Indiana, United States
 Willow Valley Township, Minnesota, United States